Secondary School Swakopmund is a school in Swakopmund in the Erongo Region of central Namibia. Established in 1967 It is one of the oldest schools in Erongo Region.

The school taught in German and Afrikaans  before Namibian Independence but has since changed to English as the medium of instruction.  it has 1,600 learners and 45 staff.

See also
 Education in Namibia
 List of schools in Namibia

References

External links 
 Official website

1967 establishments in South West Africa
Schools in Erongo Region
Swakopmund